Chiamparino is a surname. Notable people with the surname include:

Scott Chiamparino (born 1966), American baseball player
Sergio Chiamparino (born 1948), Italian politician